Ardessie (Scottish Gaelic: Àird Easaidh) is a small hamlet on the south western shore of Little Loch Broom 2 miles northwest of Dundonnell, in Garve, Ross-shire, in the Highland region and is in within the Scottish council area of Highland. Scotland.

References

Populated places in Ross and Cromarty